The YT-46-class harbor tugboat was a wood-hulled tugboat design ordered by the U.S. Navy in May and June 1918 during World War I. 40 ships of the type (Harbor Tugs Nos. 46-85) were launched and completed at 13 shipyards: the Charleston Navy Yard; the New Orleans Naval Yard; the Clayton Ship & Boat Building Company, Clayton, New York; the Eastern Shipyard Company, Greenport, New York; the Eastern Shore Shipbuilding Company, Sharpstown, Maryland; the Greenport Basin and Construction Company, Greenport, New York; the Hiltebrant Dry Dock Company, Kingston, New York; Robert Jacob Shipyard, City Island, New York; the Luders Marine Construction Company, Stamford, Connecticut; the Mathis Yacht Building Company, Camden, New Jersey; the New York Yacht, Launch & Engine Company, Bronx, New York; the Vinyard Shipbuilding Company, Milford, Delaware; and the Wheeler Shipyard Corporation, Brooklyn, New York. In 1920, at the Navy's adoption of alpha-numeric hull designations, the ships were classified as yard tugs YT-46 though YT-85.

References

Auxiliary ship classes of the United States Navy